Kenneth Scott "Kenny" Arena (born February 6, 1981) is an American former soccer defender who is currently an assistant coach for FC Cincinnati. Arena is the son of current New England Revolution and former United States coach Bruce Arena.

Player
Arena attended the University of Virginia, playing on the men's soccer team from 1999 to 2002.  Arena played for the United States U-20 men's national soccer team at the 2001 FIFA World Youth Championship.  On January 17, 2003, the MetroStars selected Arena in the fourth round (32nd overall) in the 2003 MLS SuperDraft.  He spent two seasons with the MetroStars before being traded to D.C. United in exchange for a third round selection in the 2005 Supplemental Draft.  He played one season with United and was released on December 31, 2005.

Coach
Arena served as a volunteer assistant coach with the University of Virginia for the 2006 season and helped lead the Cavaliers to the NCAA Division I Men's Soccer semifinals.  On April 2, 2007, Kenny was hired as an assistant coach at George Mason University where he was responsible for player development, recruiting and scheduling. On February 6, 2008, Arena was hired as an assistant coach by UCLA.

On March 2, 2012, Arena was hired by Florida International to be the head coach of the men's soccer team. He joined his father on the staff of the LA Galaxy for the 2014 season.

References

External links
 LA Galaxy profile

1981 births
Living people
Sportspeople from Charlottesville, Virginia
American soccer players
New York Red Bulls players
D.C. United players
Virginia Cavaliers men's soccer players
American soccer coaches
UCLA Bruins men's soccer coaches
FIU Panthers men's soccer coaches
Soccer players from Virginia
Major League Soccer players
United States men's under-20 international soccer players
New York Red Bulls draft picks
LA Galaxy non-playing staff
Association football defenders
Virginia Cavaliers men's soccer coaches
George Mason Patriots men's soccer coaches
Los Angeles FC non-playing staff
FC Cincinnati non-playing staff